The Fremantle-class patrol boats were coastal patrol vessels operated by the Royal Australian Navy (RAN) from 1979 to 2007. Designed by British shipbuilder Brooke Marine and constructed in Australia by NQEA, the Fremantle class were larger, more powerful, and more capable than the preceding , and the two primary patrol boat bases required infrastructure upgrades to support them. Although up to 30 vessels were planned, fifteen were ordered and constructed, with an unexercised option for five more.

Their retirement was announced in 2001 and a decommissioning schedule published in 2004. From May 2005 they were replaced by the  patrol boats with the last two Fremantles decommissioning in May 2007. Most of the class were scrapped, with two marked for preservation as museum ships. The Fremantle class has also appeared in two drama television series based on the Royal Australian Navy.

Planning and development
The concept for the Fremantle class began somewhere between 1967 and 1969, as the s entered service, and areas for improvement were observed. In September 1970, the RAN announced the intention to construct ten new patrol boats, which would operate in tandem with the Attack class and replace two general purpose vessels. These new vessels were intended to enter service between 1976 and 1980. The number of vessels to be built fluctuated, peaking at thirty vessels (16 RAN, 4 Royal Australian Naval Reserve, and 10 for the military of Papua New Guinea), and settling at fifteen.

Plans of acquisition were announced in April 1975, with eleven shipbuilders submitting tenders, of which two were shortlisted in 1976; Brooke Marine of Eng,and and Lürssen Werft of West Germany. Brooke Marine won the contract to design and produce the lead ship, with NQEA contracted to build the other fourteen vessels. An option for an additional five vessels existed, but they were placed on indefinite hold in 1982. There was a separate acquisition plan for six missile-armed variants, but this was suspended due to the lack of available funding, and the belief that such ships could be constructed on short notice if required.

Design and construction
The design of the Fremantle class called for ships with improved seakeeping, and newer equipment and weapons than those fitted to the Attack class. The Fremantles were 28% longer and 50% heavier than their predecessors. During sea trials, NUSHIP Fremantle was revealed to be 20 tons over the contracted limit. Main propulsion machinery consisted of two MTU series 538 diesel engines, which supplied  to the two propeller shafts. They also had an APU (auxiliary propulsion unit that was fitted in the interest of fuel saving whilst on patrol. (One Dorman 12-cylinder auxiliary propulsion engine) These were later removed as they proved inefficient when compared to the two main engines Exhaust was not expelled through a funnel, like most ships, but through vents below the waterline. The ship's company consisted of 22 personnel. Each patrol boat was armed with a single, bow-mounted Bofors 40 mm L/60 gun as main armament, supplemented by two .50-calibre Browning machineguns and an 81 mm mortar, although the mortar was removed from all ships sometime in the late 1990s. The main weapon was originally to be two 30-mm guns on a twin-mount, but the reconditioned Bofors were selected to keep costs down; provision was made to install an updated weapon later in the class' service life, but this did not eventuate.

This resulted in a $10 million infrastructure upgrade for the two bases, which was completed in 1981 and 1982, respectively. This included modern maintenance, logistic, and administrative facilities at both bases, and the installation of a synchro-lift at Coonawarra.

Construction of Fremantle began in October 1977. It was launched on 16 February 1979, and commissioned on 17 March 1980. During sea trials, Fremantle received distinction for locating and rescuing a British sailor thrown from a commercial trawler following its collision with an oil tender. Construction of the first Australian-built vessel, began in September 1978, with Warrnambool launched on 25 October 1980 and commissioned on 14 March 1981. The final ship of the class, was commissioned on 15 December 1984. The Australian-built vessels were built through an assembly-line method. Hulls were built upside-down from the keel to the second-uppermost deck, then rolled over and built to the top of the hull. After this, the superstructure, which had been fabricated at the same time, was welded onto the hull. Construction of the class (including the two naval base upgrades) cost $150 million. All fifteen vessels were named after Bathurst-class corvettes.

Operational history
The first ship of the class, arrived in Australia on 27 August 1980, after an 82-day voyage covering . NQEA completed three patrol boats in both 1981 and 1982, and four in both 1983 and 1984. Also by 1984, all of the Attack class had left active service, with many transferring to the RAN Reserve or the Indonesian Navy.

On 31 May 1985, Wollongong grounded on rocks at Gabo Island, causing extensive damage to the vessel. It was repaired by the builder, and returned to service in late 1986.

From May 2005 onwards, the Fremantles were replaced in service by the fourteen  patrol boats. During late 2006, the decommissioned  remained laid up alongside  in Waverton, Sydney for use as the alongside set for the drama series Sea Patrol.

During 2006 and 2007, most of the Fremantles were broken up for scrap in Darwin, at a cost of between $400,000 and $450,000 each to the Australian government.

Fremantle class in fiction

The fictional HMAS Hammersley is the setting of the first season of Channel Nine's 2007 drama series Sea Patrol. A second patrol boat, HMAS Kingston, also appears in the series. From the second season onwards, an Armidale-class boat is used.

Ships

Citations

References

Books

Journal and news articles

Websites

 
Patrol boat classes